The Dhol Foundation is both a dhol drum institute in London and a musical group playing bhangra music. The dhol school was founded in 1989  by former Alaap member Johnny Kalsi when several musicians asked him to be their teacher, and a first album was released by Kalsi and his students in 2001.

Dhol drums are a traditional percussion instrument from the Punjab province in the north of India, from which Kalsi originates. In London he experimented with dance beats and electronic music, which he mixes with the traditional bhangra style in his albums.

Their music has been featured in Hollywood films such as Gangs of New York and The Incredible Hulk, and have worked with Peter Gabriel on the soundtrack to the film Rabbit-Proof Fence. They opened the Commonwealth Games in Melbourne in 2006.

TDF have a connection to WOMAD, as they own the copyright to all of their songs, and they have also performed at WOMAD many times of the past few years. In fact, in the past two years, they have played at Womad Reading twice, despite not being scheduled to appear either time.

Although officially released in 2005, 200 pre-release 'festival edition' copies of the album Drum-Believable were available to those who attended Womad Reading in 2004. These are now a rarity.

Discography
2001: Big Drum Small World
2005: Drum-Believable
2007: Drums 'n' Roses
2010: Drum Struck
2017: Basant

See also
The Bollywood Brass Band
Afro Celt Sound System
Asian Dub Foundation
Transglobal Underground
Peter Gabriel

External links
The Dhol Foundation
[ TDF on allmusic.com]

Bhangra (music) musical groups
British world music groups
Asian Underground musicians
Musical groups established in 1989